Eduard Hau (Russian: Эдуард Петрович Гау; 28 July 1807 in Reval – 3 January 1888 in Dorpat) was a Baltic German painter and graphic artist.

Life and work 
He was the son of painter Johannes Hau, who had emigrated from Northern Germany in 1795, and he grew up in the German community of Tallinn ("Reval" in German). His half-brother was the painter Woldemar Hau. From 1830 to 1832, he studied at the Dresden Academy of Fine Arts.

From 1836 to 1839, he lived in Tartu ("Dorpat"), where he also spent the last years of his life. In between, he apparently lived in Saint Petersburg, where he produced numerous interior portraits of rooms in the Winter Palace, the Peterhof Palace and other Royal residences. He was on the membership list at the Imperial Academy of Arts in 1854, and probably remained in Russia until c.1880.

The Gatchina Palace was burned by German troops during World War II. When it was rebuilt, the interior was restored using Hau's paintings as a guide.

Outside of Russia, he is primarily known for his portraits of the Professors at the University of Dorpat. They appeared from 1837 to 1839 and were distributed in a series of lithographs, in six issues, by the firm of Georg Friedrich Schlater. The portrait subjects included Friedrich Karl Hermann Kruse, Nikolay Pirogov and Friedrich Georg Wilhelm Struve. He also produced well-known portraits of Friedrich Robert Faehlmann (1837, lithograph) and Johann Carl Simon Morgenstern (1838, oil painting).

Selected lithographs of the professors

Interiors of the Winter Palace

References

External links 

 "A walk through The Hermitage". Watercolors by Eduard Hau. 
 Paintings by Eduard Hau in the digital collection of the Estonian Art Museum

1807 births
1888 deaths
Artists from Tallinn
People from the Governorate of Estonia
Baltic-German people
19th-century Estonian painters
19th-century Estonian male artists
Estonian lithographers
Estonian printmakers